Operation Aloha may refer to:

 Operation Aloha, a coalition military operation of the Iraq War
 Operation Aloha (album), 2009, the only album released by the supergroup Operation Aloha